The Roewe RX3 is a subcompact crossover manufactured by SAIC's sub brand, Roewe. The original RX3 was sold from 2017 and received an update called the RX3 Pro in 2021. A larger hybrid variant in the compact crossover SUV segment called the Lomemo was available from May 2022.

Overview
The RX3 crossover shares the underpinnings with the MG ZS, and is positioned below the Roewe RX5 compact crossover.

In 2019, the Roewe RX3 received an update for the China VI emission standards. The 2019 Roewe RX3 was officially launched on 17 June with the highlight of the 2019 Roewe RX3 being the child safety seat, it features an integrated child safety seat on the rear seats. According to the SAIC, it takes only four steps to complete the switch between the ordinary rear seat and the child safety seat. Additionally, the panoramic sunroof will be the standard configuration for the updated 2019 models.

The Roewe RX3 is powered by a 1.6- litre naturally aspirated petrol engine and a 1.3-litre turbocharged petrol engine. The transmissions options are six-speed automatic gearbox for the 1.3-litre turbocharged engines, and manual and CVT gearboxes supplied by Aisin for the 1.6-litre engines.

Roewe RX3 Pro
The Roewe RX3 Pro was announced on March 19, 2021, as the 2021 facelift for the RX3 model range. The RX3 Pro features a redesigned front end and restyled tail lamps with options adding an additional "chasing orange" color. The redesigned front features standardize LED headlights across the range and the update also includes a panoramic sunroof and 10.1-inch suspended high-definition large screens for the interior. The engine is mated to a five-speed manual transmission or CVT.

Roewe Totoro / Lomemo
Unveiled in May 2022, the Roewe Lomemo is a hybrid compact crossover variant based on the Roewe RX3 Pro. The original Chinese name translates to Totoro, and the English name is also a transliteration of the Chinese name pronunciation, Lóng Māo. The Lomemo features redesigned front and rear ends resulting in a slight length, width and height difference with the length extended to  allowing it to be classified as a compact crossover. The updated design also resulted in a wider  width and  height while the wheelbase remains to be . In terms of power, the Roewe Lomemo is equipped with a hybrid system consisting of a 1.5-litre engine and an electric motor.

References

External links

2010s cars
Cars introduced in 2017
Cars of China
Front-wheel-drive vehicles
Mini sport utility vehicles
RX3
Vehicles with CVT transmission